Lilly Burns is an American television producer who co-founded Jax Media. In January 2022, she was named president of Imagine Entertainment.

Biography 
Burns's father is the documentary filmmaker Ken Burns. Her uncle, Ric Burns, and sister, Sarah Burns, are also documentary filmmakers. She graduated from Columbia University in 2009.

She co-founded Jax Media with Tony Hernandez and John Skidmore in 2011. She won a Peabody Award in 2014 for producing Inside Amy Schumer.

As executive producer, she was nominated for six Emmy Awards for her work on Hack Into Broad City (2014), A Very Murray Christmas (2015), Russian Doll (2019), and Emily in Paris (2020). She was also nominated for two Gotham Awards for her work on Search Party and Russian Doll.

She married Tony Hernandez in 2015. The couple and their two children live in Boerum Hill.

Filmography

References

External links 

 

Living people
American women television producers
American women television directors
American television directors
American television producers
Columbia College (New York) alumni
Peabody Award winners
Year of birth missing (living people)